Attaullah (born 8 May 1990) is an Afghan cricketer. He made his first-class debut for Amo Region in the 2017–18 Ahmad Shah Abdali 4-day Tournament on 25 November 2017.

References

External links
 

1990 births
Living people
Afghan cricketers
Amo Sharks cricketers
Place of birth missing (living people)